Bodenham is a village in Herefordshire, England.

Bodenham may also refer to:

Bodenham, Wiltshire, a hamlet near Nunton, England
Cecily Bodenham (died after 1543), last Abbess of Wilton Abbey
Francis Bodenham (c.1582–1645), English politician
Henry Bodenham (1511/12–1573), English politician
John Bodenham (c.1559–1610), English anthologist
Martin Bodenham (born 1950), English football referee and cricket umpire
HMS Bodenham (M2609), Royal Navy minesweeper